Badīʿ al-Dīn, known as Shāh Madār, and by the title Qutb-ul-Madar 1315–1434), was a Syrian Sufi who migrated to India where he founded the Madariyya Sufi brotherhood. He is held in high esteem as a patron saint.

Biography
Badi' al-Din hailed originally from Syria, and was born in Aleppo in 1315 CE. In later centuries, a growing number of legends arose in relation to Badi' al-Din, which resulted in sources continuously backdating his year of birth. These same sources also disagree about Badi' al-Din's descent.  Some state that he was a sayyid, that is, a descendant of the Islamic prophet Muhammad, and trace his descent back to Imam Ja'far al-Sadiq (died 765 CE). Others mention descent from Muhammad's companion (sahabi) Abu Hurayra, who died  CE. The assertion that Badi' al-Din was a Jew who had converted to Islam is not corroborated by other sources. 

His teacher was Bayazid Tayfur al-Bistami. After making a pilgrimage to Medina, he journeyed to India to spread the Islamic faith. He converted many Hindus to Islam in India. Here he founded the Madariyya order. His tomb, built by order of Sultan Ibrahim Sharqi (1402–40), is at Makanpur.

References

Sufi saints
Islamic philosophers
People from Aleppo
Syrian Sufi saints
Syrian emigrants
Burials in India
1315 births
1434 deaths